Melaleuca calyptroides is a plant in the myrtle family, Myrtaceae and is endemic to the southwest of Western Australia. It is similar to a number of other Western Australian melaleucas such as M. hollidayi with its almost cylindrical leaves, purple pom-pom flower heads and low growth habit but it has longer, wartier leaves and fewer flowers in the inflorescences.

Description
Most of the leaves are densely covered with distinct, raised oil glands.

The flowers are a shade of pink to purple and appear singly or in small heads on the ends of branches which continue to grow after flowering, sometimes also in the upper leaf axils. The stamens are arranged in bundles of five around the flower, usually with 8 to 15 stamens in each bundle. The floral cup and woody capsule from which it develops are longer than those of similar melaleucas.

Taxonomy and naming
The specific epithet (calyptroides) is from the Ancient Greek word  meaning "cover" or "conceal", hence "calyptra". The ending -oides is a Latin suffix meaning "resembling" or "having the form of".

Distribution and habitat
This melaleuca occurs in and between the Watheroo, Morawa, Merredin, Hyden and Coolgardie districts in the Avon Wheatbelt, Coolgardie, Geraldton Sandplains, Mallee and Yalgoo biogeographic regions. It grows in heath, scrub and shrubland in clayey sand or loam over laterite.

Conservation status
Melaleuca calyptroides is listed as "not threatened" by the Government of Western Australia Department of Parks and Wildlife.

References 

calyptroides
Myrtales of Australia
Plants described in 1999
Endemic flora of Western Australia
Taxa named by Lyndley Craven